was a Japanese football player. He played for Japan national team.

Club career
Ide was born in Shizuoka on November 27, 1908. He played Tokyo OB Club. He won 1933 Emperor's Cup with Shiro Teshima and Teiichi Matsumaru at the club.

National team career
In May 1930, when Ide was a Waseda University student, he was selected Japan national team for 1930 Far Eastern Championship Games in Tokyo and Japan won the championship. At this competition, on May 25, he debuted against Philippines.

Ide died on August 17, 1998 at the age of 89.

National team statistics

References

External links
 
 Japan National Football Team Database

1908 births
1998 deaths
Waseda University alumni
Association football people from Shizuoka Prefecture
Japanese footballers
Japan international footballers
Association football midfielders